Welikanda is a town situated in Polonnaruwa District in North Central Province, Sri Lanka. 

Welikanda Divisional Secretariat is a  Divisional Secretariat  of  Polonnaruwa District. 

Populated places in Polonnaruwa District
Populated places in Sri Lanka